Wymondham Bridewell was the local prison or bridewell in Wymondham, Norfolk. The site was in use as a prison from as early as 1619. The present, grade II listed building dates from the 1780s. It closed as a prison in 1878. Since then it has had various uses including police station and courthouse. At present the main part of the building houses the Wymondham Heritage Museum.

The building was constructed in the form of a square and, in the 1820s the Governor's house was at the front, cells were either side and the treadmill was at the back, There were 22 cells and most of them were 12×7 feet. They had brick floors and contained two iron beds, some three.

In 1824, the Bridewell staff included the Governor, two turnkeys and a miller and it contained two classes, two wards, treadwheel (image), three day-rooms, two airing yards and the mill yard. After 1827 the Bridewell remained unoccupied until it was re-opened, chiefly for the incarceration of females in 1832. The average number of prisoners, in 1842, was 19. By 1853, although the Bridewell was a woman's prison, it was sometimes used to house men awaiting transfer, with even quite dangerous prisoners kept there.

The conditions appear to have been quite civilised by the 1850s, as there were only nineteen inmates at the time of the 1853 report. Of the prisoners, five were under 16, five were married and 14 unmarried. The women were instructed in reading and writing by the Matron and the Chaplain holds regular services and instruction and many of the prisoners ended up taking jobs at the time of their release. The employment for the prisoners at the time included washing, ironing, mat-making, knitting, needle-work and cleaning the prison. The inmates at Wymondham were responsible for making, mending & washing the linen for Norwich Castle Prison, as well as their own and this work alone was valued at £69 9/9d that year.

References 

 White's Directory of Norfolk, 1845

External links 

 Wymondham Heritage Museum - official site
 Map sources for 
 
 A 1786 description
 The local Quaker meeting currently worships in part of the building

Grade II listed buildings in Norfolk
Local museums in Norfolk
Prison museums in the United Kingdom
Wymondham, Norfolk